The 2022 Kingston upon Thames London Borough Council election took place on 5 May 2022 to elect all 48 members of Kingston upon Thames London Borough Council. The elections took place alongside local elections in the other London boroughs and elections to local authorities across the United Kingdom.

The Liberal Democrats retained overall majority control of the council, the fifth time in the last six elections that the party has won overall control.

Background

History 

The thirty-two London boroughs were established in 1965 by the London Government Act 1963. They are the principal authorities in Greater London and have responsibilities including education, housing, planning, highways, social services, libraries, recreation, waste, environmental health and revenue collection. Some of the powers are shared with the Greater London Authority, which also manages passenger transport, police and fire.

Since its formation, Kingston upon Thames has been under Liberal Democrat control, Conservative control and no overall control. The Liberal Democrats have controlled the council since 2002, apart from the period between 2014 and 2018 when the Conservatives had an overall majority. The Liberal Democrats regained control in the most recent election in 2018, where they won 39 seats with 51.7% of the vote and the Conservatives won the remaining nine seats with 30.6% of the vote. The Labour Party lost both seats they were defending and received 11.9% of the vote across the borough.

Council term 

A Liberal Democrat councillor, Sharon Falchikov-Sumner, left her party in 2018 after the council voted to close their last residential care home. She joined the Green Party in February 2019. In March 2020, the council leader Liz Green was successfully challenged by Caroline Kerr, a Liberal Democrat councillor who was first elected in 2018. A Liberal Democrat councillor for Chessington South, Tricia Bamford, resigned in December 2020 due to a change in her family circumstances. A by-election to replace her was not held until 6 May 2021 due to the COVID-19 pandemic. The by-election, which was contested by thirteen Official Monster Raving Loony Party candidates, was won by the Liberal Democrat candidate Andrew MacKinlay. Mackinlay had previously served as the Labour MP for Thurrock. In September 2021, the Liberal Democrat councillor Jon Tolley left his party due to policy disagreements with the council executive. He announced that he wouldn't contest the next election, saying "I think we were lying to the public" about the demolition of aleisure centre in his ward. Kerr announced her resignation as council leader in October 2021.

As with most London boroughs, Kingston upon Thames was electing its councillors under new boundaries decided by the Local Government Boundary Commission for England, which it produced after a period of consultation. The number of councillors remained at 48, but the commission produced new boundaries following a period of consultation, with ten three-member wards and nine two-member wards.

Electoral process 
Kingston upon Thames, like other London borough councils, elects all of its councillors at once every four years. The previous election took place in 2018. The election took place by multi-member first-past-the-post voting, with each ward being represented by two or three councillors. Electors will have as many votes as there are councillors to be elected in their ward, with the top two or three being elected.

All registered electors (British, Irish, Commonwealth and European Union citizens) living in London aged 18 or over were entitled to vote in the election. People who lived at two addresses in different councils, such as university students with different term-time and holiday addresses, were entitled to be registered for and vote in elections in both local authorities. Voting in-person at polling stations took place from 7:00 to 22:00 on election day, and voters were able to apply for postal votes or proxy votes in advance of the election.

Previous council composition

Results summary

Ward Results 
Since elections were fought on new boundaries, vote share can't be directly compared with the 2018 results. Candidates marked * were sitting councillors at the time of election.

Alexandra

Berrylands

Canbury Gardens

Chessington South & Malden Rushett

Coombe Hill

Coombe Vale

Green Lane & St James

Hook & Chessington North

King George's & Sunray

Kingston Gate

Kingston Town

Motspur Park & Old Malden East

New Malden Village 
Election was postponed due to the death of Mary Jean Clark

Norbiton

Old Malden

St Mark's & Seething Wells 

Sharron Sumner was elected in 2018 in Alexandra ward as a Liberal Democrat, but resigned from the council in early 2022.

Surbiton Hill

Tolworth

Tudor

2022-2026 by-elections

Green Lane & St James

References 

Council elections in the Royal Borough of Kingston upon Thames
Kingston upon Thames